Paul Michael Stephani (September 8, 1944 – June 12, 1998) was an American serial killer. He was also known as the Weepy-Voiced Killer due to a series of telephone calls he made to police, anonymously reporting his crimes in a remorseful and high-pitched voice. Stephani killed three women in the Minneapolis–Saint Paul area.

Background
Stephani was the last of ten children born into a Catholic family. His mother remarried when he was three years old, giving him a stepfather who was known to beat his stepchildren and sometimes throw them down the stairs. Stephani was married to Beverly Lider and fathered a daughter with her, but the couple soon divorced. He held down several jobs, but was fired from a janitor position at Malberg Manufacturing Company in 1977. His first victim's body would be discovered near this building.

Killings
On December 31, 1980, Stephani beat Karen Potack in Saint Paul, Minnesota, inflicting severe wounds and brain injury. Stephani himself called police at 3 a.m. to report the attack, directing police to a location where "There is a girl hurt there."

His next victim was Kimberly Compton, an 18-year-old student from Pepin, Wisconsin on June 3, 1981 in neighboring Minneapolis. After killing her, he again contacted police pleading: "God damn, will you find me? I just stabbed somebody with an ice pick. I can't stop myself. I keep killing somebody." Two days later he called police to say he was sorry for stabbing Compton and would turn himself in, but did not. On June 6, he called to say newspaper accounts of some of the murders were inaccurate. His next call was on June 11. In a whimpering, barely coherent voice he cried: "I'm sorry for what I did to Compton."

His next victim was Kathleen Greening, who was found dead at her home just outside Saint Paul. Stephani later confessed to drowning her in her bathtub at her Roseville residence. His fourth victim (and last murder victim) was Barbara Simons, a 40-year-old nurse on the Minneapolis side of the Mississippi River. The two met at the Hexagon Bar, after Stephani asked Simons for a cigarette, which she gave him.

After spending the night at the bar with Stephani, Simons told a waitress, "He's cute. I hope he's nice, since he's giving me a ride home." Simons was found stabbed to death the next day. There were no calls after Greening's death, but the "Weepy-Voiced Killer" contacted police after the murder of Simons: "Please don't talk, just listen... I'm sorry I killed that girl. I stabbed her 40 times. Kimberly Compton was the first one over in Saint Paul."

Capture
Stephani picked up a 19-year-old sex worker named Denise Williams on August 21, 1982, in Minneapolis. Williams sensed something was wrong when Stephani began driving through a dark, suburban area, rather than returning her back to the city where he originally picked her up. After turning onto a dead-end road, he stabbed her fifteen times with a screwdriver. During the attack, Williams was able to hit Stephani on the head with a glass bottle, causing cuts to his head and face.

Her screams drew the attention of a man who lived nearby and upon seeing Stephani trying to stab Williams again began to wrestle with him, causing Stephani to flee the scene. The man was able to call for an ambulance and later help identify Stephani. However, when Stephani returned home to his apartment, he noticed he was bleeding badly and sought medical help. It was this call that confirmed Stephani was the "Weepy-Voiced Killer" and linked him to the Williams attack. Further in-depth investigative work later connected Stephani to the murder of Simons.

In 1997, Stephani was diagnosed with skin cancer and had less than a year to live. He decided to confess to the murders of Kim Compton, Barbara Simons and Kathy Greening. He had not even been a suspect in the Greening death, as he had not made a phone call to police as he had done in the other cases. In all, he confessed to a beating attack in 1980, stabbing Kimberly Compton to death in 1981, drowning Kathleen Greening in 1982, stabbing Barbara Simons to death in 1982, and stabbing Denise Williams in 1982.

Trial and death
During Stephani's trial in the Simons murder case, Stephani's ex-wife, sister and a woman who lived with him testified that they believed the hysterical caller revealing the attacks was Stephani. Those observations alone were not enough to identify Stephani as the Weepy-Voiced Killer since the hysterical crying distorted the voice. Stephani was convicted of the Simons murder and of the attempted murder of Williams and was sentenced to 40 years. He died in prison in 1998 from skin cancer.

Media
The case was covered by Casefile True Crime Podcast on April 16, 2016 and in an episode ("Seeing Red") of Murder Calls on January 15, 2017.

Stephani's crimes were then reported during episode 102 (titled "Quantum Madness and an Abundance of Icicles") of the podcast And That's Why We Drink on January 13, 2019. 

This case was also covered in an episode ("Rough Winds & High Waters") on the podcast My Favorite Murder on May 23, 2019.

This case was also featured on an episode of Morbid: A True Crime Podcast on January 9, 2021. 

The show Mark of a Killer featured the case on its seventh episode, titled "Killer Caller".

This case was covered by the "Serial Killer Podcast" in November 2020.

See also 
 List of serial killers in the United States

References

External links 
 Casefile True Crime Podcast - Case 15: The Weepy Voiced Killer - 16 April 2016
 Murder Calls Season 1: Seeing Red - 15 January 2017

1944 births
1982 murders in the United States
1998 deaths
20th-century American criminals
American male criminals
American people convicted of attempted murder
American people convicted of murder
American people who died in prison custody
American serial killers
Criminals from Minnesota
Male serial killers
People convicted of murder by Minnesota
People from Austin, Minnesota
Prisoners who died in Minnesota detention
Serial killers who died in prison custody
Violence against women in the United States